Vinon-sur-Verdon is a commune in the northwestern part of the Var department in the Provence-Alpes-Côte d'Azur region in Southeastern France. The town is on the left bank of the river Verdon near the Gorges du Verdon. The commune is on the departmental border with Vaucluse and Alpes-de-Haute-Provence; as of 2019, it had a population of 4,248.

Vinon-sur-Verdon's airfield (ICAO Airport Code LFNF) is a popular location for the sport of gliding and was the location for the 2006 World Gliding Championships.

Geography

Climate

Vinon-sur-Verdon has a hot-summer Mediterranean climate (Köppen climate classification Csa).

See also
Communes of the Var department

References

Communes of Var (department)